Boys Republic is a private, all-boys school for troubled adolescents located in Chino Hills, California. It was founded in 1907 by Margaret Fowler.  As an adolescent, Steve McQueen was remanded there.  He was known to demand razors and jeans in his contracts so that he could donate them to the school.

References

Educational institutions established in 1907
1907 establishments in California